Pandanus whitmeeanus, commonly known as the Samoan pandanus, is a species of Pandanus (screwpine) believed to be native to Vanuatu. It has been introduced to Samoa, Tonga, the Cook Islands, and the Hoorn Islands by Austronesian voyagers. It is also known in Samoan and Tongan as ‘ara ‘āmoa or paogo.

Taxonomy
Pandanus whitmeeanus was first described in 1905 by the Italian botanist Ugolino Martelli. It is the type species of the section Coronata and is unique among all other Pandanus species in that has centripetally-arranged stigmata.

Description

Uses
The leaves are woven into mats, baskets, and other handicrafts. The fruits are edible.<ref name="cook">{{cite web |title=Pandanus whitmeeanus'''  Samoan Pandanus |url=http://cookislands.bishopmuseum.org/species.asp?id=6474 |website=Cook Islands Biodiversity & Natural Heritage |publisher=The Cook Islands Natural Heritage Trust |accessdate=15 January 2019}}</ref>

See alsoPandanus amaryllifoliusPandanus odoratissimusPandanus utilis''
 Domesticated plants and animals of Austronesia

References

External links

whitmeeanus
Flora of Samoa
Flora of Vanuatu
Flora of Tonga
Flora of the Cook Islands
Flora of Wallis and Futuna